Joseph Henry Vernon (November 25, 1889 – March 13, 1955) was a pitcher in Major League Baseball. He played for the Chicago Cubs and Brooklyn Tip-Tops.

References

External links

1889 births
1955 deaths
Major League Baseball pitchers
Chicago Cubs players
Brooklyn Tip-Tops players
Los Angeles Angels (minor league) players
Baseball players from Massachusetts
Amherst Mammoths baseball players